Palazzo Fenzi is a palace in Florence, Italy.

Built in the 16th century for the Castelli family by Gherardo Silvani, it was later enlarged by the Marucelli family. In 1829 it was bought by Emanuele Fenzi in order to house his  bank and his family.

It is currently home to the History Department of the University of Florence.

Interiors
Among many other Baroque architectural features such as ornate ceilings and marble sculptures, the Palazzo Fenzi has a wide variety of frescoes, some of which by the painter Sebastiano Ricci. These frescoes were executed during his stay in Florence from 1706 to 1707, and are now considered as some of his masterpieces. During this period he first completed a large fresco series on allegorical and mythological themes in the Marucelli-Fenzi palace before going on throughout Italy and Europe. He was later to influence the Florentine Rococo fresco painter Giovanni Domenico Ferretti.

Sources
Cambridge Journals, Isabella Bigazzi and Zeffiro Ciuffoletti "Palazzo Marucelli Fenzi Guida storico-artistica" Fenzi Family Archive Trust "Il Possesso di Rusciano". A.G.M., Florence 1990

See also
Fenzi

External links

Houses completed in the 16th century
Fenzi